South Passage may refer to:

 South Passage (Houtman Abrolhos), Western Australia, a channel
 South Passage (Queensland), a channel
 South Passage (Shark Bay), Western Australia, a channel

See also
 South Pass (disambiguation)